Tamarix gallica, the French tamarisk, is a deciduous, herbaceous, twiggy shrub or small tree reaching up to about 5 meters high.

It is indigenous to Saudi Arabia and the Sinai Peninsula, and very common around the Mediterranean region. It is present in many other areas as an invasive introduced species, often becoming a noxious weed. It was first described for botanical classification by the taxonomist Carl Linnaeus in 1753, but had already been in cultivation since 1596.

Description
It has fragile, woody branchlets that drop off in autumn along with the small, scale-like leaves that cover them. The leaf-shape is an adaptation over time to exceedingly dry conditions.

The pink flowers are tiny, hermaphroditic, and are borne on narrow, feather-like spikes. They frequently bloom earlier than the leaves, first in May, and sometimes a second time in August.

In its native range the plant grows in moist areas such as riverbanks, especially in saline soils. It has been grown as an ornamental plant for its profuse production of showy pink flower spikes. In Algeria and surrounding areas it has been used medicinally for rheumatism, diarrhea, and other maladies. Its juice is an ingredient for Gaz, a Persian delicacy from Isfahan.

References

External links
Calflora Database: Tamarix gallica (French tamarisk) — introduced species in California.
Jepson Manual Treatment of Tamarix gallica — introduced species.

gallica
Flora of North Africa
Flora of Southeastern Europe
Flora of Southwestern Europe
Flora of Western Asia
Trees of Europe
Flora of Algeria
Flora of Egypt
Flora of Libya
Flora of Saudi Arabia
Flora of France
Plants described in 1753
Taxa named by Carl Linnaeus
Medicinal plants